DQuarius D'Juan Thomas (born December 4, 1998) is an American football linebacker who is a free agent. He played college football at Middle Tennessee where he is the school's all time leader in tackles for loss with 53. He originally signed with the New York Jets as an undrafted free agent in 2022.

High school career
Thomas played high school football for Oxford High School in Oxford, Mississippi. He lettered in football and power lifting while also earning All-State and All-Region honors. In his senior season in 2016 he made 115 tackles, nine tackles for loss, 1.5 sacks, four hurries, and five interceptions at safety.

College career
Thomas played in all thirteen games and made one start. He finished the season with nine tackles, two sacks, and 2.5 tackles for loss, having his best game against FIU where he made three tackles alongside one sack, 1.5 tackles for loss, and a forced fumble. He made his only start of the season against Charlotte.

During Thomas' sophomore season he played in all fourteen games with twelve starts. He ranked tied for third on his team for tackles with seventy while also having a team high 14.5 tackles for loss and sacks with eight. He had his best game of the season in a 27–7 win over UAB where he had seven total tackles, three tackles for loss, two sacks, and a forced fumble, causing him to also be named the C-USA Defensive Player of the Week.

He started twelve of the twelve games he played during his junior season. He was second on the team with a career high 74 tackles, and a team leading twelve tackles for loss. He also tallied two sacks, two forced fumbles, and a single pass breakup. He led the team in tackles in their game against Michigan, with ten.

He started all nine games. He ranked third on the team with 67 tackles, seven tackles for loss, 3.5 sacks, and two forced fumbles. He led the team's linebackers in snaps with 660. He had a career high in tackles in a game with twelve against North Texas.

He started ten of twelve games, finishing third on the team with 89 tackles, a career-high seventeen tackles for loss, five sacks, two interceptions, seven hurries, and a fumble forced and recovery. He finished ninth nationally in tackles for loss per game with 1.4. He was voted a team captain for the season along with being voted Second-Team All-C-USA. After missing the team's game against UTSA he returned against Charlotte and had four tackles and two hurries to earn the team's defensive player of the game award. He made his first career interception against Liberty. He earned his second career C-USA Defensive Player of the Week after having ten tackles, two tackles for loss, and a pick-6 against Southern Miss. He was named as the Bahamas Bowl Defensive MVP after having eight tackles, 1.5 tackles for loss, and a pass breakup in the 31–24 win over Toledo.

Statistics
He finished his career ranked first all-time in career tackles for loss with 53 and third all-time in sacks with 20.5.

Professional career

New York Jets
After going undrafted in the 2022 NFL Draft, Thomas signed with the New York Jets on May 6, 2022. He was released on August 30, 2022, and then spent a week on the practice squad before being released again.

Green Bay Packers
On September 20, 2022, Thomas signed with the Green Bay Packers' practice squad.

References

External links
 Green Bay Packers bio
 Middle Tennessee Blue Raiders bio

1998 births
Living people
Players of American football from Mississippi
Sportspeople from Oxford, Mississippi
American football linebackers
New York Jets players
Green Bay Packers players